Twist is an  unincorporated community in Cross County, Arkansas, United States. Twist was named after a nearby plantation of the same name.

Twist was mentioned in the B.B. King song "Lucille" as the location of a club where he once played. It was at this club in Twist where two men started a fight over a woman named Lucille which set the place on fire. Because of this incident, King named his famous guitar Lucille.

The blues musician Little Mack Simmons (1933–2000) was born in Twist.

References

Gallery

Unincorporated communities in Arkansas
Unincorporated communities in Cross County, Arkansas